Janko Puhar (1 April 1920 – 27 May 1985) was a Yugoslav swimmer. He competed in three events at the 1948 Summer Olympics.

References

1920 births
1985 deaths
Yugoslav male swimmers
Olympic swimmers of Yugoslavia
Swimmers at the 1948 Summer Olympics
Place of birth missing